Alhaji Shekuba Saccoh (born in Kalangba, Bombali District) is a Sierra Leonean diplomat and the current Sierra Leone's ambassador to Guinea. He was appointed to the position by president Ahmad Tejan Kabbah. He is a member of the Mandingo.

He was the favoured choice by many prominent SLPP members in the Northern Province to be chosen as Solomon Berewa's running mate for the 2007 Presidential and Parliamentary elections. The position, however, went to foreign minister Momodu Koroma. He ran again for the SLPP leadership at the party convention held in on April 12, 2009 in the south-eastern city of Kenema but he came in third place behind John Oponjo Benjamin and J.B Dauda.

After losing at the convention, Saccoh accused the SLPP of being a Mende party. He claimed the only reason he lost the leadership is because he is not from the Mende ethnic group. Saccoh said was unfairly treated because he is from the minority Mandingo ethnic group, the same ethnic group former Sierra Leone's president Ahmad Tejan Kabbah belongs to.

External links
http://news.sl/drwebsite/publish/article_20052053.shtml

Sierra Leonean diplomats
Year of birth missing (living people)
Living people
Sierra Leone People's Party politicians
Ambassadors of Sierra Leone to Guinea
Sierra Leonean Mandingo people
People from Bombali District